Demario Beck (born 1994) is an American professional basketball player for the Surrey Scorchers in the British Basketball League.

College career 
Beck spent two years playing at South Georgia Technical College and was named first-team All-GCAA in his sophomore year. He was the team's highest scorer averaging 11.0 points per game over 25 games, and leading rebounder with an average of 9.8 per game.

In 2016, he joined Coastal Carolina University for his junior year. He averaged 10.0 points, 0.6 assists, 7.8 rebounds and 0.6 steals per game in the 2016–17 season, and 9.8 points, 0.7 assists, 7.2 rebounds and 0.5 steals per game in the 2017–18 season.

Professional career 
After graduating from Coastal Carolina University, Beck went undrafted in the 2018 NBA draft. In August 2018, he joined British Basketball League team the Surrey Scorchers.

References 

1994 births
Living people
American expatriate basketball people in the United Kingdom
American men's basketball players
Basketball players from Georgia (U.S. state)
Coastal Carolina Chanticleers men's basketball players
Junior college men's basketball players in the United States
People from Bleckley County, Georgia
Power forwards (basketball)
Surrey Scorchers players